The 2001 Critérium du Dauphiné Libéré was the 53rd edition of the cycle race and was held from 10 June to 17 June 2001. The race started in Morzine and finished in Chambéry. The race was won by Christophe Moreau of the Festina team.

Teams
Thirteen teams, containing a total of 104 riders, participated in the race:

 
 
 
 
 
 
 
 
 
 
 
 Mercury–Viatel

Route

General classification

References

Further reading

External links

2001
2001 in French sport
Critérium du Dauphiné Libéré